Transcription factor SOX-9 is a protein that in humans is encoded by the SOX9 gene.

Function 

SOX-9 recognizes the sequence CCTTGAG along with other members of the HMG-box class DNA-binding proteins. It is expressed by proliferating but not hypertrophic chondrocytes that is essential for differentiation of precursor cells into chondrocytes and, with steroidogenic factor 1, regulates transcription of the anti-Müllerian hormone (AMH) gene.

SOX-9 also plays a pivotal role in male sexual development; by working with Sf1, SOX-9 can produce AMH in Sertoli cells to inhibit the creation of a female reproductive system. It also interacts with a few other genes to promote the development of male sexual organs. The process starts when the transcription factor Testis determining factor (encoded by the sex-determining region SRY of the Y chromosome) activates SOX-9 activity by binding to an enhancer sequence upstream of the gene. Next, Sox9 activates FGF9 and forms feedforward loops with FGF9 and PGD2.  These loops are important for producing SOX-9; without these loops, SOX-9 would run out and the development of a female would almost certainly ensue. Activation of FGF9 by SOX-9 starts vital processes in male development, such as the creation of testis cords and the multiplication of Sertoli cells. The association of SOX-9 and Dax1 actually creates Sertoli cells, another vital process in male development. In the brain development, its murine ortholog Sox-9 induces the expression of Wwp1, Wwp2, and miR-140 to regulate cortical plate entry of newly born nerve cells, and regulate axon branching and axon formation in cortical neurons.

Clinical significance 

Mutations lead to the skeletal malformation syndrome campomelic dysplasia, frequently with autosomal sex-reversal and cleft palate.

SOX9 sits in a gene desert on 17q24 in humans.  Deletions, disruptions by translocation breakpoints and a single point mutation of highly conserved non-coding elements located > 1 Mb from the transcription unit on either side of SOX9 have been associated with Pierre Robin Sequence, often with a cleft palate.

The Sox9 protein has been implicated in both initiation and progression of multiple solid tumors. Its role as a master regulator of morphogenesis during human development makes it an ideal candidate for perturbation in malignant tissues. Specifically, Sox9 appears to induce invasiveness and therapy-resistance in prostate, colorectal, breast and other cancers, and therefore promotes lethal metastasis. Many of these oncogenic effects of Sox9 appear dose dependent.

SOX9 localisation and dynamics 
SOX9 is mostly localised in the nucleus and it is highly mobile. Studies in chondrocyte cell line has revealed nearly 50% of SOX9 is bound to DNA and it is directly regulated by external factors. Its half-time of residence on DNA is ~14 seconds.

Role in sex reversal

Mutations in Sox9 or any associated genes can cause reversal of sex and hermaphroditism (or intersexuality in humans). If Fgf9, which is activated by Sox9, is not present, a fetus with both X and Y chromosomes can develop female gonads; the same is true if Dax1 is not present. The related phenomena of hermaphroditism can be caused by unusual activity of the SRY, usually when it's translocated onto the X-chromosome and its activity is only activated in some cells.

Interactions 

SOX9 has been shown to interact with Steroidogenic factor 1, MED12 and MAF.

See also 
 SOX genes

Further reading

References

External links 
 
 
 
 
 

Transcription factors